Frederick Field may refer to:

Frederick Field (chemist) (1826–1885), English chemist
Frederick Field (scholar) (1801–1885), English theologian and biblical scholar
Frederick Field (Royal Navy officer) (1871–1945), British Admiral of the Fleet
Frederick Vanderbilt Field (1905–2000), American communist
Frederick Field (retailer) (born 1953), American retail billionaire
Fred Tarbell Field, former Chief Justice of the Massachusetts Supreme Judicial Court

See also 
Frederick Fields (disambiguation)